T Power (born Marc Royal) is an English drum and bass producer from Bow, London. Originally starting his production career in the UK hardcore scene, he moved into jungle. He was signed to drum and bass/jungle record label Botchit and Scarper. Wanting to avoid the increasing politics within the scene, he began to produce experimental drum and bass, culminating in the album, The Self Evident Truth of an Intuitive Mind. Following from this, came the next album Waveform. Less accessible, it carried his experimental tracks further into the left field.

Partnering with Shy FX, he released the album Long Time Dead, which featured vocals and electric violin by Ysanne Spevack and also started a record label named Digital Soundboy.

T Power was half of the band Chocolate Weasel, with Chris Stevens. They released a single "Music for Body Lockers", and then a funk and hip-hop album called Spaghettification in 1998.

In 2004, in collaboration with fellow producer Andre Williams, Royal issued a couple of singles billed as 'Ebony Dubsters'.

Discography

Albums

The Self Evident Truth Of An Intuitive Mind (1995)

Waveform (1996)

Long Time Dead (2000)

Singles

References

External links
T.Power
Adastra Recordings

Living people
Year of birth missing (living people)
English drum and bass musicians
English DJs
English record producers
Musicians from London
Electronic dance music DJs